= About a Hero =

- Directed by: Piotr Winiewicz
- Written by: Kaspar; Anna Juul; Piotr Winiewicz
- Produced by: Mads Damsbo; Rikke Tambo Andersen; Sam Pressman
- Starring: Imme Beccard; Vicky Krieps; Willi Schlüter
- Cinematography: Emil Aagaard
- Edited by: Michael Aaglund; Julius Krebs Damsbo
- Music by: Lasse Aagard
- Production companies: A Tambo Film; Pressman Film
- Release date: November 16, 2024 (IDFA)
- Running time: 85 minutes
- Country: Denmark

About a Hero is a 2024 film. The screenplay was generated by Kaspar, an AI language model trained on the work of filmmaker Werner Herzog. The film premiered at the 2024 International Documentary Film Festival Amsterdam.
